James Chandler Ball (February 22, 1884 – April 7, 1963) was an American professional baseball player who played in the National League for parts of two season spanning 1907–1908. Born in Harford County, Maryland, he was drafted by the Boston Doves from the Baltimore Orioles of the Eastern League in the 1907 rule 5 draft and played in 10 games that season. He was released from the Doves in January 1908.  On August 22, 1908, his contract was later purchased by the Boston Doves from the Baltimore and played in 6 games that season.

External links

Major League Baseball catchers
Boston Doves players
Baseball players from Maryland
People from Harford County, Maryland
1884 births
1963 deaths
Montreal Royals players
Memphis Turtles players
Springfield Ponies players